is a passenger railway station located in Kita-ku of the city of Okayama, Okayama Prefecture, Japan. It is operated by the West Japan Railway Company (JR West).

Lines

Station layout
The station consists of a two elevated ground-level side platforms, with the station building underneath. The station has a Midori no Madoguchi staffed ticket office.

Platforms

Adjacent stations

History

On March 6, 1925, the station was relocated and renamed Ōmoto Station.

From August 1, 1951 to December 30, 1984, the station was also served by the Okayama Rinkō Railway.

Passenger statistics
In fiscal 2019, the station was used by an average of 1837 passengers daily

Surrounding area
Munetada Shrine
Shimotsui Electric Railway Head Office
Okayama Prefectural Psychiatric Medical Center

See also
List of railway stations in Japan

References

External links

 JR West Station Official Site

Railway stations in Okayama
Uno Line
Railway stations in Japan opened in 1910